Lucas Township is one of fifteen townships in Effingham County, Illinois, USA.  As of the 2010 census, its population was 495 and it contained 174 housing units.

Geography

Extinct towns
 Eberle
 Winterrowd

Cemeteries
The township contains these five cemeteries: Merry, Morris, Mount Zion, Saint Matthew Lutheran and Scott.

Demographics

School districts
 Dieterich Community Unit School District 30
 North Clay Community Unit School District 25

Political districts
 Illinois' 19th congressional district
 State House District 108
 State Senate District 54

References
 
 United States Census Bureau 2007 TIGER/Line Shapefiles
 United States National Atlas

External links
 City-Data.com
 Illinois State Archives

Townships in Effingham County, Illinois
1860 establishments in Illinois
Populated places established in 1860
Townships in Illinois